Pittsburg is a community in Lawrence County, Alabama, United States. It has a latitude of 34.52528 and a longitude of -87.20583.  Its elevation is .c The community was named after the industrial heritage of Pittsburgh, Pennsylvania.

References

Unincorporated communities in Alabama
Unincorporated communities in Lawrence County, Alabama
Decatur metropolitan area, Alabama